The Austrian Black and Tan Hound is a breed of dog originating in Austria.

History 
The Austrian Black and Tan Hound, also known as the Brandlbracke, is believed by some to have descended from an ancient Celtic Hound. This breed has been around since the mid-19th century, though there is no authentic history of it prior to this time since a lack of controlled breeding meant few records were kept. This large sized hound was used for tracking wounded game, most commonly hare, in high altitudes.

Description

Appearance 
Colouring in this breed is highly important; it must be black with small, clearly defined, light to dark fawn markings. Two fawn marks above the eyes must be present. The coat is smooth, dense and short (about 2 cm in length). The long tail is slightly bent and the ears are medium in length and lie flat with rounded tips. They weigh 15 to 22 kg (33-49 pounds).

Temperament 
It has a keen sense of smell. It is an elegant runner, used in all sorts of game. It has a lovely voice, and makes a great pet due to its good-natured personality. It is not a dog wanting to be in a city. A suitable home will be in a rural area where the dog will have much space to run unrestricted by a leash. It loves to work.

Care 
The Austrian black and tan hound needs daily exercise. The breed will only require a once-a-week brushing and bathing only when necessary. Nails need to be trimmed regularly and ears need to be cleaned every day to avoid ear infections. There are currently no genetic diseases known to affect this breed, which is fairly healthy, and lives up to 12 to 14 years of age.

Etymology 
Brandlbracke is a compound word, stemming from "Brand" (harmful fire, fire that went out of control) which refers to the fawn markings and "Bracke", a type of hunting dog.

Vieräugl is the Austro-Bavarian diminutive of "Vierauge", meaning: somebody our something having four eyes. It refers to the distinctive fawn markings above the eyes.

See also
 Dogs portal
 List of dog breeds

References

FCI breeds
Rare dog breeds
Scent hounds
Dog breeds originating in Austria